Environmental epidemiology is a branch of epidemiology concerned with determining how environmental exposures impact human health. This field seeks to understand how various external risk factors may predispose to or protect against disease, illness, injury, developmental abnormalities, or death. These factors may be naturally occurring or may be introduced into environments where people live, work, and play.

Scope
The World Health Organization European Centre for Environment and Health (WHO-ECEH) claims that 1.4 million deaths per year in Europe alone are due to avoidable environmental exposures. Environmental exposures can be broadly categorized into those that are proximate (e.g., directly leading to a health condition), including chemicals, physical agents, and microbiological pathogens, and those that are distal (e.g., indirectly leading to a health condition), such as socioeconomic conditions, climate change, and other broad-scale environmental changes. Proximate exposures occur through air, food, water, and skin contact. Distal exposures cause adverse health conditions directly by altering proximate exposures, and indirectly through changes in ecosystems and other support systems for human health.

Environmental epidemiology research can inform government policy change, risk management activities, and development of environmental standards. Vulnerability is the summation of all risk and protective factors that ultimately determine whether an individual or subpopulation experiences adverse health outcomes when an exposure to an environmental agent occurs. Sensitivity is an individual’s or subpopulation’s increased responsiveness, primarily for biological reasons, to that exposure.  Biological sensitivity may be related to developmental stage, pre-existing medical conditions, acquired factors, and genetic factors. Socioeconomic factors also play a critical role in altering vulnerability and sensitivity to environmentally mediated factors by increasing the likelihood of exposure to harmful agents, interacting with biological factors that mediate risk, and/or leading to differences in the ability to prepare for or cope with exposures or early phases of illness. Populations living in certain regions may be at increased risk due to location and the environmental characteristics of a region.

History 
Acknowledgement that the environment impacts human health can be found as far back as 460 B.C. in Hippocrates' essay On Airs, Waters, and Places. In it, he urges physicians to contemplate how factors such as drinking water can impact the health of their patients. Another famous example of environment-health interaction is the lead poisoning experienced by the ancient Romans, who used lead in their water pipes and kitchen pottery. Vitruvius, a Roman architect, wrote to discourage the use of lead pipes, citing health concerns:
"Water conducted through earthen pipes is more wholesome than that through lead; indeed that conveyed in lead must be injurious, because from it white lead is obtained, and this is said to be injurious to the human system. Hence, if what is generated from it is pernicious, there can be no doubt that itself cannot be a wholesome body. This may be verified by observing the workers in lead, who are of a pallid colour; for in casting lead, the fumes from it fixing on the different members, and daily burning them, destroy the vigour of the blood; water should therefore on no account be conducted in leaden pipes if we are desirous that it should be wholesome. That the flavour of that conveyed in earthen pipes is better, is shewn at our daily meals, for all those whose tables are furnished with silver vessels, nevertheless use those made of earth, from the purity of the flavour being preserved in them"

Generally considered to be one of the founders of modern epidemiology, John Snow conducted perhaps the first environmental epidemiology study in 1854. He showed that London residents who drank sewage-contaminated water were more likely to develop cholera than those who drank clean water.

U.S. government regulation 
Throughout the 20th century, the United States Government passed legislation and regulations to address environmental health concerns. A partial list is below.

Precautionary principle 
The precautionary principle is a concept in the environmental sciences that if an activity is suspected to cause harm, we should not wait until sufficient evidence of that harm is collected to take action. It has its roots in German environmental policy, and was adopted in 1990 by the participants of the North-Sea Conferences in The Hague by declaration. In 2000, the European Union began to formally adopt the precautionary principle into its laws as a Communication from the European Commission. The United States has resisted adoption of this principle, citing concerns that unfounded science could lead to obligations for expensive control measures, especially as related to greenhouse gas emissions.

Investigations

Observational studies 
Environmental epidemiology studies are most frequently observational in nature, meaning researchers look at people's exposures to environmental factors without intervening and then observe the patterns that emerge. This is due to the fact that it is often unethical or unfeasible to conduct an experimental study of environmental factors in humans. For example, a researcher cannot ask some of their study subjects to smoke cigarettes to see if they have poorer health outcomes than subjects who are asked not to smoke. The study types most often employed in environmental epidemiology are:

 Cohort studies
 Case-control studies
 Cross-sectional studies

Estimating risk 
Epidemiologic studies that assess how an environmental exposure and a health outcome may be connected use a variety of biostatistical approaches to attempt to quantify the relationship. Risk assessment tries to answer questions such as "How does an individual's risk for disease A change when they are exposed to substance B?," and "How many excess cases of disease A can we prevent if exposure to substance B is lowered by X amount?."

Some statistics and approaches used to estimate risk are:

 Odds ratio
 Relative risk
 Hazards ratio
 Regression modeling
 Mortality rates
 Attributable risk

Bradford Hill criteria 
To differentiate between correlation and causation, epidemiologists often apply a set of criteria to determine the likelihood that an observed relationship between an environmental exposure and health consequence is truly causal. In 1965, Austin Bradford Hill devised a set of postulates to help him determine if there was sufficient evidence to conclude that cigarette smoking causes lung cancer.

The Bradford Hill criteria are:

 Strength of association
 Consistency of evidence
 Specificity
 Temporality
 Biological gradient
 Plausibility
 Coherence
 Experiment
 Analogy

These criteria are generally considered to be a guide to scientists, and it is not necessary that all of the criteria be met for a consensus to be reached.

See also 

Epidemiology
Occupational epidemiology
Envirome
Environmental health
Environmental science
Exposome
Occupational epidemiology
Occupational safety and health

References

Further reading

External links
International Society for Environmental Epidemiology
"ENVIRONMENTAL EPIDEMIOLOGY] journal
International Epidemiological Association
Journal of Exposure Science and Environmental Epidemiology
EPIDEMIOLOGY journal[https://ehp.niehs.nih.gov Environmental Health Perspectives'' (news and peer-reviewed research journal published by the National Institute of Environmental Health Sciences)
Environmental Health News current events in environmental health

Epidemiology
Environmental health